Calgary Heritage is a federal electoral district in Alberta, Canada, that has been represented in the House of Commons of Canada since 2015.

Calgary Heritage was created by the 2012 federal electoral boundaries redistribution and was legally defined in the 2013 representation order. It came into effect upon the calling of the 2015 Canadian federal election, which was held that 19 October. It is essentially a reconfigured version of Calgary Southwest, the riding formerly represented by Stephen Harper, who served as the Prime Minister of Canada from 2006 to 2015. Territory from the former Calgary Southwest comprises 99% of the new riding, with territory from Calgary Southeast making up 1%.

While Calgary as a whole has long been considered heartland for the Conservative Party of Canada and its antecedents, Calgary Heritage is located in a particularly conservative area of Calgary. Its predecessor, Calgary Southwest, frequently gave Conservative candidates some of the highest margins in the nation. Had it existed under its current boundaries in 2011, Harper would have won over 74 percent of the vote.

While Harper was handily re-elected to this riding in 2015, his Conservatives lost their bid for a fresh mandate to the Liberals. Stephen Harper resigned as prime minister on November 4, 2015, shortly before the new prime minister Justin Trudeau was sworn in. Harper then resigned as MP for Calgary Heritage on August 26, 2016. A by-election to fill the seat was held on April 3, 2017; Bob Benzen retained it for the Conservatives and was subsequently re-elected in the nationwide elections of 2019 and 2021. Benzen retired as MP on December 31, 2022.

Geography
The riding is located in the southwestern corner of Calgary. It contains the neighbourhoods of Alpine Park, Bayview, Braeside, Bridlewood, Canyon Meadows, Cedarbrae, Chinook Park, Eagle Ridge, Evergreen, Haysboro, Kelvin Grove, Kingsland, Lakeview, North Glenmore Park (south of Glenmore Trail), Oakridge, Palliser, Pump Hill, Shawnee Slopes, Southwood, Woodbine and Woodlands.

As a safe Conservative seat, the Tories do well across the riding. However, their strongest neighbourhoods tend be in the southern part of the riding in neighbourhoods such as Shawnee Slopes and Evergreen, and in the Glenmore Reservoir area in neighbourhoods such as Bayview, Eagle Ridge (two of the wealthiest neighbourhoods in the city) and Pump Hill. The Conservatives are weaker in the northeastern corner of the riding in neighbourhoods like Kingsland, Southwood, and Haysboro.

Demographics
According to the Canada 2021 Census

Ethnic groups: 66.9% White, 8.8% Filipino, 5.0% Chinese, 3.9% South Asian, 3.9% Black, 3.6% Indigenous, 2.3% Latin American, 1.4% Arab, Multiple 1.0%
Languages: 73.5% English, 4.3% Tagalog, 2.6% Mandarin, 2.2% Spanish, 1.8% Russian, 1.8% French 
Religions: 51.1% Christian (22.8% Catholic, 3.9% United Church, 2.9% Anglican, 2.7% Christian Orthodox, 1.2% Lutheran, 1.2% Pentecostal, 16.5% Other Christian), 3.1% Muslim, 2.2% Jewish, 1.5% Hindu, 40.0% None. 
Median income: $46,000 (2020) 
Average income: $65,100 (2020)

Members of Parliament
This riding has elected the following members of the House of Commons of Canada:

Election results

References

Alberta federal electoral districts
Politics of Calgary